Kurt Paul is an American actor and stuntman.

He is perhaps best known for his work within the Psycho movie franchise, where he performed as a stunt double for Anthony Perkins in Psycho II and Psycho III, and played "Mother" in all of the scenes of Psycho III except when Perkins' face was visible at the end.

Paul has had guest roles as "Norman Baines" and "Norman Blates" in the television series Knight Rider and Sledge Hammer!, respectively. In the television movie Bates Motel Paul played the role of Norman Bates. Paul appeared in Psycho IV: The Beginning, he had a minor role as Raymond Linette.

Partial filmography
General Hospital (1978-1983) - Lt.Baines
Skatetown, U.S.A. (1979)
Psycho II (1983, stunts)
The A-Team (1984) (TV) - Intern
Knight Rider (1984) (TV) - Norman Baines
Cagney & Lacey (1985) (TV)
Sledge Hammer! (1986) (TV) - Norman Blates
Psycho III (1986, stunts)
Bates Motel (1986-1987) (TV) - Coroner Norman Bates
The Ghost Writer (1990) - Paul Bearer (scenes deleted)
Psycho IV: The Beginning (1990) (TV) - Raymond Linette
Fugitive X: Innocent Target (1996) (TV) - Cab Driver
Alien Species (1996) - Deputy Harlan Banks
Warpath (2000)
A Passion (2001) (TV) - Detective Garvin
The Bike Squad (2002) - Sheriff
Supernatural (2005) (TV) - Sheriff Tillam
The Confessional (2006) - Mr. Jenson (final film role)

Reviews

External links

Year of birth missing (living people)
Living people
American male film actors
American male television actors
American stunt performers
Place of birth missing (living people)